Indianapolis is the capital and largest city of the U.S. state of Indiana.

Indianapolis may also refer to:

Places in the United States 
Indianapolis (balance), a U.S. Census Bureau designation corresponding to that portion of the consolidated city-county entity of Indianapolis and Marion County that does not include any of the other incorporated places within the county
Indianapolis, Iowa, in Mahaska County, roughly between Iowa City and Des Moines
Indianapolis, Oklahoma, in Custer County

Other 
USS Indianapolis, the name of four United States Navy ships
USS Indianapolis: Men of Courage, a 2016 movie based on the USS Indianapolis disaster
Indianapolis Motor Speedway, an automobile racing circuit in an enclave of Indianapolis, Indiana
Indianapolis 500, famous annual motor race at the speedway
"Indianapolis" (song), a 1983 song by Menudo
"Indianapolis," a song recorded by The Bottle Rockets
Indianapolis corner, at the Circuit de la Sarthe
Indianapolis (horse), champion trotting horse from New Zealand
"Indianapolis" (Parks and Recreation), a third-season episode of the NBC sitcom Parks and Recreation

See also
 Indianópolis, a Brazilian municipality located in the west of the state of Minas Gerais